Stanislav Boreyko (born 7 April 1965) is a Soviet sprint canoeist who competed in the late 1980s. He won two medals in the K-1 10000 m event at the ICF Canoe Sprint World Championships with a silver (1989) and a bronze (1986).

References

1965 births
Living people
Soviet male canoeists
Russian male canoeists
ICF Canoe Sprint World Championships medalists in kayak